The 2004–05 NBA season was the 59th season of the National Basketball Association (NBA). It began on November 2, 2004 and ended June 23, 2005. The season ended with the San Antonio Spurs defeating the defending-champion Detroit Pistons, 4–3, in the NBA Finals.

Notable occurrences
 The NBA made its return to Charlotte as the Charlotte Bobcats. The Bobcats played their first season at the Charlotte Coliseum.
 This season also was the first year of the NBA's new divisional alignments, separating the league into six divisions of five teams instead of the previous four divisions of varying numbers of teams. As part of this realignment, the New Orleans Hornets moved from the Eastern Conference to the Western Conference.
 The current schedule format also debuted this season:
 16 games against teams in the same division (four against each team)
 24 games against six of the remaining conference teams combined, three from each division (four against each team)
 12 games against the remaining four conference teams, two from each division (three against each team)
 30 games against teams in the other conference (two against each team)
Over five seasons, each team will play each of the other conference teams outside its division a total of 18 times – 9 at home and 9 on the road.
 In February, Chris Webber was traded from the Sacramento Kings along with Michael Bradley to the Philadelphia 76ers for three forwards (Corliss Williamson, Kenny Thomas, and Brian Skinner). The Kings lost in the first round of the playoffs to the Seattle SuperSonics, 4–1, and failed to make the playoffs after 2006.
 The 2005 NBA All-Star Game was played on February 20, 2005, at the Pepsi Center in Denver, Colorado, with the East winning, 125–115. Philadelphia's Allen Iverson was named the MVP of the game.
 During All-Star Weekend, Quentin Richardson won the Three-point Shootout, Steve Nash won the Skills Challenge, and Diana Taurasi, Dan Majerle and Shawn Marion won the Shooting Stars Competition—all Phoenix Suns victories. Amar'e Stoudemire made it to the final round of the Slam Dunk Contest but failed to complete the sweep for the Suns.
 Prior to the start of this season, Shaquille O'Neal was traded to the Miami Heat after his reported fallout with former Lakers teammate Kobe Bryant. Some fans sensed this, along with the Pistons championship, as a possible end of dominance by the Western Conference. The Lakers also witnessed the loss of head coach Phil Jackson and replacement Rudy Tomjanovich as the Lakers missed out on the NBA playoffs for the fifth time in their history. However, the Western Conference has continued its domination in the regular season; since then, all playoff-bound teams in the West have either won 50 or more games, or were above .500 at the end of the season, in contrast to the Eastern Conference, where on average, three teams have had sub-.500 records.
 During the off-season, the Phoenix Suns signed unrestricted free agent Steve Nash. With the addition of coach Mike D'Antoni and his offensive-minded strategy combined with Nash's play-making skills, Phoenix won 33 games more than the year before. The Suns had the best overall record in the NBA, Nash won the MVP Award and D'Antoni won the Coach of the Year Award.
 The Memphis Grizzlies played their first game at FedExForum. The Grizzlies were also the first NBA team to install see-through shot clocks. As of the 2011–12 NBA season, all 30 teams have see-through shot clocks.
 A November 19 game between Detroit and Indiana at The Palace of Auburn Hills was disrupted with 45.9 seconds to go as a major altercation broke out between players and fans. This resulted in record-breaking suspensions, most notable of which was Ron Artest who received the longest suspension in NBA history (73 games plus the playoffs). The NBA also overhauled its league-wide security policy. This became known as "The Malice at the Palace".
 On December 9, Tracy McGrady of the Houston Rockets scored 13 points in the final 35 seconds of a game against the San Antonio Spurs to lead his team to an 81–80 victory after they trailed 76–68 with 42 seconds remaining.
 The Bulls made their first appearance in the playoffs since their 1998 championship season. The Bulls' postseason berth followed an 0–9 start to the season with the Bulls having one of the youngest rosters in NBA history.
The Washington Wizards made their first appearance in the playoffs since the team name was changed for the 1997–98 season.
 The Suns started an unofficial league tradition of a mostly exposed hardwood floor, with a darker varnish on the outside of the three-point area. They also put their team's website name on the sideline, which other teams followed suit in the coming seasons. Through the 2010–11 NBA season, all of the teams, save the Oklahoma City Thunder, had placed their team websites on the sidelines.
 The Seattle SuperSonics made the playoffs for the last time as a team from Seattle.
 Ben Gordon won the Sixth Man Award, making him the first rookie to ever win the award.
 The NBA Finals reached seven games for the first time since 1994, when the Houston Rockets faced the New York Knicks.
 On December 18, the Toronto Raptors traded five-time all-star Vince Carter to the New Jersey Nets for Eric Williams, Aaron Williams, Alonzo Mourning and a pair of first-round draft picks. Mourning was bought out of his contract on February 11 and re-signed with the Miami Heat, being paid a second salary, the veteran's minimum.
 Orlando Magic rookie Dwight Howard became the first and only player straight out of high school to start all 82 games in his rookie season. He also became the youngest to average a double-double, the youngest to average 10 rebounds in a season, and the youngest to record at least 20 rebounds in a game. However, Charlotte Bobcats rookie Emeka Okafor won Rookie of the Year that season.
 This was the final season for Reggie Miller, who spent his entire NBA career with the Pacers.
 The Minnesota Timberwolves did not make an appearance in the playoffs, which then started a 13-season playoff drought.
 Toyota became the new official vehicle of the NBA, replacing General Motors, who also lost one division from its lineup. Unlike the GM deal, however, it was restricted to the main brand, and neither Scion nor Lexus was involved.

Coaching changes

2004–05 NBA changes
Atlanta Hawks – slightly changed their road uniforms from the trim colors of white to red, added new yellow road alternate uniforms with black side panels to their jerseys and shorts.
Chicago Bulls – slightly changed their uniforms they added the Bulls secondary logo on the back of the jersey.
Charlotte Bobcats – newly expansion team added new logo and new uniforms, added dark navy blue, grey and orange to their color scheme, added side panels to their jerseys and shorts.
Dallas Mavericks – added new green road alternate uniforms with blue side panels to their jerseys and shorts.
Golden State Warriors – added new orange road alternate uniforms with dark navy blue side panels to their jerseys and shorts.
Los Angeles Lakers – slightly changed their uniforms added the secondary logo to their shorts.
Memphis Grizzlies – added new logo and new uniforms replacing teal, brown, red and black and with dark navy blue, yellow and grey to their color scheme, added side panels to their jerseys and shorts, and moved into their new arena the FedExForum.
New Orleans Hornets – added new yellow alternate road uniforms.
Portland Trail Blazers – slightly once again changed their primary logo added Trail on their wordmark on the logo.
Seattle SuperSonics – added new yellow alternate road uniforms.
Utah Jazz – added new logo and new uniforms, replacing purple, blue and teal with dark navy blue, light blue and purple to their color scheme, added side panels to their jerseys and shorts.

Final standings

By division

Eastern Conference

Western Conference

By conference

Notes
z – Clinched home court advantage for the entire playoffs
c – Clinched home court advantage for the conference playoffs
x – Clinched playoff spot
y – Clinched division title

Playoffs
Teams in bold advanced to the next round. The numbers to the left of each team indicate the team's seeding in its conference, and the numbers to the right indicate the number of games the team won in that round. The division champions are marked by an asterisk. Home court advantage does not necessarily belong to the higher-seeded team, but instead the team with the better regular season win-loss record; teams enjoying the home advantage are shown in italics.

Statistics leaders

Awards

Yearly awards
Most Valuable Player: Steve Nash, Phoenix Suns
Rookie of the Year: Emeka Okafor, Charlotte Bobcats
Defensive Player of the Year: Ben Wallace, Detroit Pistons
Sixth Man of the Year: Ben Gordon, Chicago Bulls
Most Improved Player: Bobby Simmons, Los Angeles Clippers
Coach of the Year: Mike D'Antoni, Phoenix Suns
Executive of the Year: Bryan Colangelo, Phoenix Suns
Sportsmanship Award: Grant Hill, Orlando Magic

All-NBA First Team:
F – Tim Duncan, San Antonio Spurs
F – Dirk Nowitzki, Dallas Mavericks
C – Shaquille O'Neal, Miami Heat
G – Allen Iverson, Philadelphia 76ers
G – Steve Nash, Phoenix Suns

All-NBA Second Team:
F – LeBron James, Cleveland Cavaliers
F – Kevin Garnett, Minnesota Timberwolves
C – Amar'e Stoudemire, Phoenix Suns
G – Dwyane Wade, Miami Heat
G – Ray Allen, Seattle SuperSonics

All-NBA Third Team
F – Tracy McGrady, Houston Rockets
F – Shawn Marion, Phoenix Suns
C – Ben Wallace, Detroit Pistons
G – Kobe Bryant, Los Angeles Lakers
G – Gilbert Arenas, Washington Wizards

NBA All-Defensive First Team
F – Kevin Garnett, Minnesota Timberwolves
F – Tim Duncan, San Antonio Spurs
C – Ben Wallace, Detroit Pistons
G – Bruce Bowen, San Antonio Spurs
G – Larry Hughes, Washington Wizards

NBA All-Defensive Second Team
F – Tayshaun Prince, Detroit Pistons
F – Andrei Kirilenko, Utah Jazz
C – Marcus Camby, Denver Nuggets
G – Jason Kidd, New Jersey Nets
G – Dwyane Wade, Miami Heat
G – Chauncey Billups, Detroit Pistons

NBA All-Rookie First Team
Emeka Okafor, Charlotte Bobcats
Dwight Howard, Orlando Magic
Ben Gordon, Chicago Bulls
Andre Iguodala, Philadelphia 76ers
Luol Deng, Chicago Bulls

All-NBA Rookie Second Team
Nenad Krstić, New Jersey Nets
Josh Smith, Atlanta Hawks
Josh Childress, Atlanta Hawks
Jameer Nelson, Orlando Magic
Al Jefferson, Boston Celtics

Players of the month
The following players were named the Eastern and Western Conference Players of the Month.

Rookies of the month
The following players were named the Eastern and Western Conference Rookies of the Month.

Coaches of the month
The following coaches were named the Eastern and Western Conference Coaches of the Month.

References

 
NBA
2004–05 in Canadian basketball